This is a list of Spanish football transfers for the summer sale in the 2011–12 season of La Liga and Segunda División. Only moves from La Liga and Segunda División are listed.

The summer transfer window opened on 1 July 2011, although a few transfers took place prior to that date. The window closed at midnight on 31 August 2011. Players without a club could have joined one at any time, either during or in between transfer windows. Clubs below La Liga level could also have signed players on loan at any time. If need be, clubs could have signed a goalkeeper on an emergency loan, if all others were unavailable.

Summer 2011 La Liga transfer window

See also
List of Spanish football transfers winter 2011–12

References

Spanish
2011
2011
Trans
2011